McCarthy Glacier is a broad glacier at the south side of Wisconsin Plateau, Antarctica. It flows west to merge with the lower part of Olentangy Glacier before entering Reedy Glacier just southwest of Mount McNaughton. It was mapped by the United States Geological Survey from surveys and U.S. Navy air photos, 1960–64, and was named by the Advisory Committee on Antarctic Names for Lieutenant Robert J. McCarthy, U.S. Navy, a pilot on flights to the general area during Operation Highjump, 1946–47.

References

Glaciers of Marie Byrd Land